Frank A. Cowell is Professor of Economics at the London School of Economics and Political Science. His work includes important contributions to the fields of income and wealth distribution, inequality, poverty and taxation.

Biography
Cowell was educated at Ardingly College before entering Trinity College, Cambridge where he completed his BA (1971), MA (1975) and PhD (1977) in Economics. Cowell was briefly Lecturer in Economics at University of Keele before moving to LSE in 1977. He was also Associate Editor of the Journal of Public Economics from 1988-2001.

Cowell is the former editor of Economica, a former associate editor of Hacienda Pública Española/Revista de Economia Publica, and the editor-in-chief of the Journal of Economic Inequality. He is also the Director of Distributional Analysis Research Programme at the Suntory-Toyota International Centre for Economics and Related Disciplines.

He has an h-index of 52 according to Google Scholar.

Publications
Microeconomics, Principles and Analysis (OUP 2006)

References

External links
 Frank Cowell's Experts page at the London School of Economics
 Frank Cowell's page at the Economics Department at the London School of Economics
 Frank Cowell's Personal website

Year of birth missing (living people)
Living people
People educated at Ardingly College
Alumni of Trinity College, Cambridge
Academics of Keele University
Academics of the London School of Economics